Trapped is a 1989 American made-for-television thriller film written and directed by Fred Walton, and co-written by Steve Feke. It stars  Kathleen Quinlan and Bruce Abbott in the main roles. Katy Boyer co-stars.

Plot 
After a montage of photographs reveal that a young boy has died from exposure to toxic waste spilled by a company called NTX, the child's father bids goodbye to his wife's corpse, and heads for the Kupper-Dietz Building, a luxurious tower containing offices and laboratories owned by NTX. As the working day concludes, businesswomen Mary Ann Marshall and Renni are the last two daytime employees to leave the skyscraper, but on their way out they discover that all of the exits are sealed, and that all of the telephones are dead.

While searching for aid, the pair spot an intruder, and rush to the security room, which they find abandoned, with signs of a violent struggle evident. The two are then attacked by the dead boy's father; Renni is killed, but Mary Ann escapes by falling into an elevator, which brings her up to one of the tower's unfinished condominiums. There, she meets John Doe, a corporate spy who has been secretly living in the building in order to steal industrial secrets from NTX. While John goes to investigate Mary Ann's claims of there being a killer on the loose, Mary Ann, after another close encounter with the murderer, heads up to the penthouse apartment to seek aid from Harold Manley, the head of NTX; Mary Ann instead finds Manley dead, with newspaper articles about NTX stabbed into his chest.

Mary Ann reunites with John, who had stumbled onto the bodies of a pair of murdered guards, and together the two go looking for the building's remaining watchman, finding him just as he is fatally bludgeoned by the killer, who they narrowly evade. After John's arm is broken in a subsequent run-in with the maniac, he and Mary Ann separate, with Mary Ann going into hiding in the parking garage. When the killer finds her, he and Mary Ann engage in a vehicular chase, during which the murderer's car begins leaking fuel. John, who had been drawn to the garage by the noise, sets the spilled gas on fire, which blows the killer's car up after he crashes it into Mary Ann's.

When the building comes out of automatic lockdown at 6:00am, John slips away. Mary Ann is treated by paramedics and questioned by the police, and returns home, where she is greeted by John.

Cast 
 Kathleen Quinlan as Mary Ann Marshall
 Bruce Abbott as John Doe
 Katy Boyer as Renni
 Ben Loggins as Killer
 Tyrees Allen as Danny
 Miles Mutchler as Mr. Kappleman
 Wirt Cain as Harold Manley
 Bill Whitehead as Mr. Danuser

Reception 
Ray Loynd of the Los Angeles Times praised the film as "a tightly wrought thriller" while People's John Stark criticized it heavily, writing, "it has stilted dialogue, is badly acted and moves as quickly as a bloated buffalo. The title gives fair warning about what the movie is like to sit through." John Stanley, author of Creature Features: The Science Fiction, Fantasy, and Horror Movie Guide, similarly referred to Trapped as a "Clichéd TV-movie, lacking in originality."

References

External links 
 

1989 films
1980s slasher films
1989 television films
1980s horror thriller films
American slasher films
American horror thriller films
Fiction about corporate warfare
1980s English-language films
American films about revenge
American horror television films
Films directed by Fred Walton (director)
American thriller television films
USA Network original films
Fictional portrayals of the Dallas Police Department
Films about businesspeople
Films about security and surveillance
Films set in Dallas
Films shot in Dallas
Films shot in Los Angeles
Experimental medical treatments in fiction
Films about mass murder
Office work in popular culture
Films set in offices
1980s American films